This page lists the results of the 2016 São Paulo Carnival.

Grupo Especial

Grupo de acesso

Grupo 1

Grupo 2

Grupo 3

Grupo 4

See also 
 Results of the 2016 Rio Carnival

References 

Sao Paulo